Ore City Independent School District is a public school district based in Ore City, Texas (USA) that serves most of the citizenry surrounding Lake O' the Pines.

Located in northeastern Upshur County, the district extends into small portions of Marion and Harrison counties.

Ore City ISD has three campuses - Ore City High (Grades 9-12), Ore City Middle (Grades 6-8), and Ore City Elementary (Grades PK-5).

The Ore City Elementary school is currently Exemplary

The Ore City Middle school is currently Exemplary

The Ore City High school is currently Recognized

In 2009, the school district was rated "academically acceptable" by the Texas Education Agency.

References

External links
Ore City ISD

School districts in Upshur County, Texas
School districts in Harrison County, Texas
School districts in Marion County, Texas